A waffle is a batter- or dough-based cake cooked in a waffle iron.

Waffle(s) may also refer to:

Arts
 "Waffle" (song), a 2000 song by Sevendust
 "Waffle", a 1995 song by Sunny Day Real Estate from Sunny Day Real Estate
 Waffle (Catscratch), a character on Catscratch
 Ilya Ilych Telegin or Waffles, a character in Anton Chekhov's Uncle Vanya

Science and technology
 Waffle (bbs), a bulletin board service software program
 Waffles (machine learning), an open source collection of machine learning algorithms and tools
 Waffles (John Kerry), a Google bomb created during the 2004 US presidential election

Other uses
 Waffle (game show), a British game show
Waffle the Wonder Dog, a British television show
 The Waffle, a Canadian political movement
 Waffle (speech), speech that involves equivocating or blathering
Waffles (episode), the 39th episode of the first season of Teen Titans Go! and the 39th overall episode of the series.
Waffles, the main character in Waffles + Mochi.

See also
 Potato waffle, a potato-based food shaped like a waffle
 Waffle House, a franchised restaurant chain in the United States
 Waffle iron
 Waffle fabric, absorbent cotton cloth woven with a permanent waffle structure
 Waffle slab, a type of concrete slab
 WAFL (disambiguation)